David L. Anderson (born May 14, 1956) is an American politician and a Republican member of the South Dakota House of Representatives representing District 16 since May 13, 2013.  He was appointed by Governor Dennis Daugaard after Patty Miller resigned.

References

External links
 Official page at the South Dakota Legislature
 
 Biography at Ballotpedia

Place of birth missing (living people)
Living people
Republican Party members of the South Dakota House of Representatives
1956 births
21st-century American politicians
People from Lincoln County, South Dakota